The Summer of Sangailė is a 2015 romantic teen drama film written and directed by Alantė Kavaitė. It was screened in the Panorama section of the 65th Berlin International Film Festival. The film won the directing award in the dramatic world cinema category at the 2015 Sundance Film Festival. It also won Best Film, Best Actress (Julija Steponaitytė) and best set design (Ramunas Rastauskas) at the Silver Crane Awards. The film was selected as the Lithuanian entry for the Best Foreign Language Film at the 88th Academy Awards but it was not nominated.

Plot
Sangailė is a simple girl who dreams of becoming a stunt pilot but her lack of self-confidence and vertigo are preventing her from getting into a cockpit. Sangailė meets another teenage girl, Austė, at an air show. As the two girls spend more time together Austė finds ways to get alone time with Sangailė. Throughout the film Sangailė is shown cutting herself in her bathroom. Austė uses photography and fashion to highlight Sangaile's inner and outer beauty. The two girls become romantically involved and they enjoy their summer days together revealing their passions and secrets. Austė tries to help Sangailė stop cutting herself by becoming her support system and listening to her. There are scenes between Sangailė and her parents that show a strained relationship between her and her mother. Eventually Austė convinces Sangailė to go on a stunt plane ride but Sangailė's vertigo kicks in causing her to feel sick and blame Austė. Sangailė eventually apologizes to Austė for yelling and ignoring her. With the support of Austė, Sangailė decides to train herself to get over her vertigo so she can ride in a plane again. The film ends with two years having passed since Austė and Sangailė last saw each other and both are living their dreams. Austė got into fashion school and Sangailė is flying planes for the air show.

Cast
 Julija Steponaityte as Sangailė
 Aistė Diržiūtė as Austė 
 Jūratė Sodytė as Sangailė's mother
 Martynas Budraitis as Sangailė's father

See also
 List of LGBT films directed by women
 List of lesbian, gay, bisexual or transgender-related films of 2015
 List of submissions to the 88th Academy Awards for Best Foreign Language Film
 List of Lithuanian submissions for the Academy Award for Best Foreign Language Film

References

External links
 

2015 films
2015 drama films
2015 LGBT-related films
Lithuanian drama films
Lithuanian-language films
Lithuanian LGBT-related films
LGBT-related drama films
LGBT-related coming-of-age films
Lesbian-related films
French drama films
Dutch drama films
2010s French films